Croix-Chapeau is a commune in the Charente-Maritime department in southwestern France.

History
From 1953 to 1966 there was a 500-bed U.S. Army hospital in Croix-Chapeau, run by the 28th General Hospital unit, which is actually located on the neighboring town of Aigrefeuille-d'Aunis. For a while after 1966 it was used as a French Military Hospital. After being abandoned for several years, it was sold to a developer, who in the 2000s repurposed it as an industrial park.

Notable people
Paul Henderson, born August 15, 1962 in Croix-Chapeau, former Chief Minister of the Northern Territory for Australia.

Population

See also
Communes of the Charente-Maritime department

References

External links

 Photograph of the abandoned American Army hospital at Croix-Chapeau, Flickr
 , Web site of the village : http://www.croix-chapeau.fr/

Communes of Charente-Maritime
Charente-Maritime communes articles needing translation from French Wikipedia